Peter Kurer (born 28 June 1949) is a Swiss manager and lawyer. He was chairman of UBS AG from April 23, 2008 until his dismissal in 2009. He chaired the corporate responsibility  and strategy committees of UBS AG. From April 2016 until April 2020 he was chairman of Sunrise Communications AG.

Education
Kurer graduated with a licenciate in law from the law school of the University of Zürich and also holds a doctorate in law from the same school and an LL.M. degree from the University of Chicago Law School. He clerked at the District Court of Zürich and was admitted as an attorney-at-law in the Canton of Zürich.

Career
From 1980 to 1990, Kurer practiced as an attorney with the Zürich office of the international law firm Baker and McKenzie, first as an associate and later as a partner. From 1991 to 2001, Kurer was a partner at the Swiss law firm Homburger (now: Homburger AG) in Zürich.

In 2001, Kurer was appointed group general counsel and member of the group managing board of UBS AG and in 2002, he was appointed member of the executive board. On 1 April 2008, UBS announced that he would become chairman of the board of directors, replacing Marcel Ospel. On 4 March 2009, UBS announced that Kurer would step down as chairman of the board in April and that Kaspar Villiger would be nominated to succeed him.

From April 2016 until April 2020 he was chairman of Sunrise Communications AG.

Awards and honours
Kurer is a member of the visiting committee to the Law School of The University of Chicago. He is also a member of the board of trustees of a foundation that acts as an advisory board to the University of St. Gallen Program for Law and Economics, and a member of the committee of continuing education, Executive School of Management, Technology and Law, at the University of St. Gallen.

References

External links
Peter Kurer on UBS.com
 CV – Peter Kurer. In: Sunrise (PDF, Archiv)

1949 births
Living people
UBS people
Swiss businesspeople
20th-century Swiss lawyers